The Little Cacapon River is a  free-flowing tributary of the Potomac River in the center of Hampshire County, West Virginia. Via the Potomac River, its waters are part of the Chesapeake Bay watershed, leading to the Atlantic Ocean. The Little Cacapon enters the Potomac at an elevation of  near the community of Little Cacapon. For the majority of its course the Little Cacapon is a shallow non-navigable stream. It has been historically referred to as both Little Cacapehon and Little Capecaphon.

The Little Cacapon is formed at the confluence of two small streams, the North Fork Little Cacapon and the South Fork Little Cacapon, shortly after they both pass north under the Northwestern Turnpike (U.S. Route 50) at Frenchburg. Flowing from a hollow in Town Hill, Shawan Run feeds into the Little Cacapon at Barnes Mill. Two miles (3 km) north, Three Churches Run also feeds into the river from Town Hill. At Higginsville on Slanesville Pike (County Route 3) near the old Vinita School, the river is fed by Crooked Run at Queens Ridge ( high). From Higginsville, the Little Cacapon continues northeast along Town Hill with  Noland Ridge bounding it to the east. Also in the vicinity of Higginsville, Little Cacapon-Levels Road (County Route 3/3) intersects with Slanesville Pike, and as its name suggests, the road follows the Little Cacapon north until it diverges northwest to Levels via Hoffman Hollow. It is within this stretch of the stream that the Little Cacapon meanders by the community of Creekvale. At the entrance of Neals Run, the Little Cacapon is met to its east by  Spring Gap Mountain and then flows beneath the Baltimore and Ohio Railroad and empties into the Potomac River.

Bridges

North Fork Little Cacapon River 
The North Fork is a  tributary of the Little Cacapon. The North Fork's source lies in a hollow between  Piney Mountain and the southwestern end of  Stony Mountain. From its source, the North Fork flows northeast along Grassy Lick Road (County Route 10). South Branch Mountain ( high) joins the North Fork to its west, and along with Stony Mountain to its east, the river diverges from Grassy Lick Road and continues its northeastern route to Shanks where it meets US Route 50. From Shanks, the North Fork merges with Camp Run and flows east under US Route 50 at Frenchburg, where it merges with the South Fork to create the Little Cacapon River.

South Fork Little Cacapon River 
The South Fork is an  tributary of the Little Cacapon. The South Fork is formed at its headwater in a hollow towards the southeastern end of Stony Mountain along South Fork of Little Cacapon Road (County Route 12) between the communities of Kirby and Ruckman. From its source, the South Fork flows northeast toward Bell Hollow, where it meets US Route 50 and turns north through Frye's Flat towards Frenchburg. The South Fork continues north under US Route 50, where it immediately joins with the North Fork to form the Little Cacapon River alongside Little Cacapon River Road (County Route 50/9).

Tributaries 

Tributary streams are listed in order from south to north.

South Fork Little Cacapon River
Bell Hollow Run
North Fork Little Cacapon River
Camp Run
Shawan Run
Trinton Hollow Run
Three Churches Run
Graybill Hollow Run
Crooked Run
Hopkins Lick Run
Dug Hill Run
Hoffman Hollow Run
Chimney Hollow Run
Neals Run
Lapley Hollow Run

List of cities and towns along the Little Cacapon River 

Barnes Mill
Creekvale
Frenchburg
Higginsville
Little Cacapon
Shanks

Gallery

See also 
List of West Virginia rivers

References

External links

Rivers of West Virginia
Rivers of Hampshire County, West Virginia
Tributaries of the Potomac River